Roy B. Zuck (born January 20, 1932, Phoenix, Arizona – March 16, 2013) was a Christian educator and author.

Early life and education 
Roy was born January 20, 1932, and raised in Phoenix, Arizona. He had a bachelor of arts from Biola University in California, and a Th.M. from Dallas Theological Seminary in Texas (1957). Roy B. Zuck also earned a Doctor of Theology degree from Dallas in 1961. He also attended Northern Illinois University and North Texas State University in the 1970s.

Career 
Zuck was listed in Outstanding Young Men in America (1965), National Register of Prominent Americans (1987), Who's Who in Texas Today (1987), Who's Who in American Education (1991–92), Who's Who in the South and Southwest (1992), National Directory of Distinguished Leadership (1994), and Who's Who Among American Teachers (2000). In 1970, Zuck was named the Alumnus of the Year at Biola University. He has also been a member of the Board of Directors of TEAM, The Evangelical Alliance Mission (1968–95, 1996–99).

Death
Zuck died on March 16, 2013, at age 81. He was married to a wife who predeceased him, and he was father to two children.

References 

1932 births
2013 deaths
Writers from Phoenix, Arizona
Biola University alumni
Dallas Theological Seminary alumni
American Christian writers